Shotley Park is a former stately home and estate near the town of Shotley Bridge in County Durham, England. It is a listed building with grade II.

The house was built by Jonathan Richardson, the founder of Shotley Bridge Spa, the driving force in the town’s rapid growth in the mid 19th century.

The Richardson family sold Shotley Park to the Priestman family in the late 19th century following the death of John Richardson on Christmas Day 1871.

Following wartime use during WW2, the main property fell into institutional use before being gifted to Barnardo's in the 1950s. Since the late 1980s the main building has been used as a residential care home for the elderly.

References 

Grade II listed buildings in County Durham
Houses in County Durham
Consett